Gérard De Athée written in Magna Carta 1215 as Gerardi de Athyes. He was a Principal military commander and Lord from Athee Sur Cher in now France. He possessed his own Castle, Arms and badge of "A Lion  contrapasssant qui retourne ca tete" of Guyenne Aquitaine and that as used by King Richard Coer De Leon under whom he is first referenced. He later seamlessly transferred to  King John of England from 1211 to 1215 following the death of King Richard in 1199 at the siege of Chalus.

He served King John in France as commander of Loches castle, one of the last castles to resist Philip Augustus in Normandy. D'Athée was captured by the French and, being so highly valued by King John, ransomed back to England in return for 2,000 marks. He and his extended families and kinsmen were granted estates in England, and De Athee was appointed High Sheriff of Gloucestershire and Herefordshire (1208-1210) and High Sheriff of Nottinghamshire, Derbyshire and the Royal Forests in 1209.  His rapid rise in the English court caused resentment amongst the English barons.  He is mentioned critically in clause 50 of Magna Carta:

References 

BBC History
Magna Carta and two Sheriffs of Gloucestershire ~ By Russell Howes

12th-century births
Year of death unknown
French mercenaries
High Sheriffs of Derbyshire
High Sheriffs of Gloucestershire
High Sheriffs of Herefordshire
High Sheriffs of Nottinghamshire